Emily Harbour was a settlement in Labrador, Canada. It is located on Brig Harbour Island. The first Post Master was Reuben Ghosse.

See also
 List of communities in Newfoundland and Labrador

Ghost towns in Newfoundland and Labrador